Staroye Subkhankulovo (İśke Sobxanğol) is a rural locality (a selo) in Subkhankulovsky Selsoviet, Tuymazinsky District, Bashkortostan, Russia. The population was 784 as of 2010. There are 19 streets.

Geography 
Staroye Subkhankulovo is located 10 km southeast of Tuymazy (the district's administrative centre) by road. Subkhankulovo is the nearest rural locality.

References 

Rural localities in Tuymazinsky District